Baugh is a surname. Notable people with the surname include:

 Carl Baugh (born 1936), American creationist
 Dan Baugh (born 1974), Canadian rugby union player
 Daniel A. Baugh (born 1931), American historian of British naval administration
 Daniel Baugh Brewster (1923–2007), U.S. Senator from Maryland
 Dickie Baugh (1864–1929), English footballer 
 Dickie Baugh Jr. (1902–1972), English footballer 
 Kevin Baugh (born 1962), American micronationalist
 Marcus Baugh (born 1994), American football player
 Matt Baugh (born 1973), British ambassador
 Phil Baugh (1936-1990),
American musician, studio musician, songwriter, guitar player, inventor
 Sammy Baugh (1914–2008), American football player
 Scott Baugh (born 1962), American politician
 Tom Baugh (born 1963), American football player